Filipino fashion designer Lesley Mobo has worked in Paris and London. He spent his early years in Philippines before moving to London to study Fashion. After gaining a University degree in Biology and a scholarship offer from a prestigious Medical school, he instead turned his hands into fashion design. Graduating from the prestigious Central St Martin's in 2002 with a First Class B.A. Honours Degree in Fashion, his final year collection titled "Maniac" was co-sponsored by Cerruti allowing him to use luxurious tailoring fabrics from Lanifico Fratelli Cerruti Italy. He also received the Colin Barnes Award for fashion illustration from Central St Martin's, a nomination in the Chartered Society of Designers Fashion Awards held in the British Natural History Museum, and participated in the ‘Fashion in Motion exhibition  exhibition at the Victoria and Albert Museum  from which his works were featured in the BBC News. In 2002 he was interviewed by John Galliano  for the House of Christian Dior, and has also assisted for Clements Ribeiro and Cacharel. In 2002 he was scouted from college by Mohammed Al Fayed owner of Harrods Department store, he accepted a designer post and helped established a lifestyle brand  in Harrods , London.
 
In 2003 he was promoted to Head Designer for the Jasmine Di Milo label working closely with its design team and Jasmine Al Fayed. As a pioneering member of the team he helped the brand to grow by showcasing its latest collection every season during Paris Fashion Week at the grand palatial Hôtel Ritz Paris and Villa Windsor , boasting more than 370 of the most sought-after stockists worldwide.
 
In 2004 he completed an M.A. in Fashion at Central Saint Martin's gaining a Distinction where he studied under the tutelage of the legendary professor Louise Wilson OBE .  He showcased his M.A collection Obesity in the North Pole for Autumn/Winter 04-05 at London Fashion Week in February 2004, in Florence (winning the Emilio Pucci Award) and at the International Talent Support in Trieste where he caught the approving eyes of Renzo Rosso of Diesel, Ennio Capasa of Costume National and Raf Simons when he won the International Diesel Award  In the same year he was invited by the world's most famous debating society, the Oxford Union, to present his Obesity in the North Pole collection to University of Oxford students. In 2005 he designed a sell-out capsule collection called Lesley Mobo by Diesel using Ingeo fibre  which was manufactured by Staff International S.p.A., distributed and sold by Diesel in its major flagship stores in London, Milan, Paris, New York, Antwerp, Berlin and Tokyo.

In 2005 he designed men's underwear for Absolut Label 1879 Collection in collaboration with Absolut Vodka Sweden.

In 2008 he was invited by the University of the Arts London, to sit on their Industrial Advisory panel for the London College of Fashion, and in March he was honoured  to be invited by the Ayala Corporation to participate in the Bravo festival , a tribute to Philippine Artists showcasing his Matavenero Collection. In the same year he created his underwear line for men and women in partnership with Bench, one of the country's fastest growing global brands in Asia and the Middle East.
 
In 2009 he started wholesaling his MOBO womenswear line in Paris during Paris Fashion Week with his clothes exhibited at Musée du Louvre, and was featured in Italian Vogue. The brand is sold in selected Independent boutiques and department stores in Hong Kong, Japan, Korea, Greece, Spain, Germany, Italy, France, Russia, Lebanon, Jordan, Egypt, Bahrain, Riyadh, Dubai and Qatar.

After leaving Harrods, in 2011 he has been approached by L'Wren Scott to head its global design team and to help improve the trading position of its fashion brand and drive sales.

On 25 March 2012 ETC Channel announced Lesley Mobo  as the finale judge of Project Runway Philippines Season 3, It was the most watched episode from Solar Entertainment Corporation, which handles the production, stated that the three-year gap from the previous season was due to "internal concerns" it needed to address as ETC moves from cable to a "free-to-air" format.

On 29 October 2012 he staged the biggest fashion show in South East Asia at the impressive Mall of Asia Arena  with a 45 piece collection for Cignal Digital TV  and TV5 a premier satellite TV provider in South East Asia, together with its living/Lifestyle magazine channel, Colors  TV Channel. The exclusive event also benefitted the underprivileged. The event also featured the LIGHTOMORROW Project with Save the Children Foundation, a non-profit organisation that aims to make quality education accessible and affordable to the less fortunate. Through the guests’ pledges of support, the beneficiaries of the said foundation will have easier access to education with the use of computers that will enable a home schooling approach.

From 2012-2015 he consulted for both luxury and high street brands in the UK and Asia. In  2013-2015  he designed his top selling T-shirt line "MOBO Lesley Mobo" Feel The Sea concept for Women, Men, Girls, Kids and Babies for the Japanese giant brand Uniqlo selling in China, Hong Kong, Macau, Korea, Taiwan, Singapore, Malaysia, Indonesia, Philippines, Thailand, Australia and U.S.A. making it one of the best selling line of products in Uniqlo Stores for 4 years.

In 2014 he was listed in the 6th edition of  Who's Who in Fashion  along with legendary fashion designers Azzedine Alaïa, Miuccia Prada, Giorgio Armani, Valentino, Coco Chanel and Gianni Versace published by Bloomsbury Publishing and Fairchild Books.

Early 2015 it was announced that the designer will be launching a new Underwear Collection and a perfume line for men and women with retail giant Suyen Corporation and Bench,  the licensing deal is primarily marketed within Asia and the Middle East.

In 2015 he was hired by Touker Suleyman a British-Turkish Cypriot fashion retail entrepreneur and investor to head the design for Ghost. Suleyman purchased UK fashion label Ghost after its owner, KCAJ, an Icelandic investment fund, cut investment following the collapse of the Icelandic banking market.[15] The acquisition safeguarded 142 jobs across the company. In the same year Mobo designed the iconic "Salma dress" for James Bond "Spectre" worn by Léa Seydoux. The dress ranked 7th of "The best Bond girl fashion moment" of All Time both by  American Vogue and British Vogue.

School of Fashion 

On August 8, 2018,Lesley Mobo in partnership with Meridian International Business, Arts and Technology College (or MINT College), opened the School of Fashion. It is also offering scholarship grants hosted by the Red Charity Gala, an annual Philippine fashion event.

Lesley Mobo Chocolates 

2020 During the pandemic the designer created a limited edition chocolates "Si Aida, Is Lorna, Is Fe". He collaborated with Filipino chocolate brand Auro and Chef Victor Magsaysay "an homage to the islands". The flavours were encapsulated in a limited edition collection that Auro meticulously crafted from scratch. Each collectible chocolate box is inspired by the delicate flavours of Luzon, Vizayas and Mindanao region embodied by Mobo's beautiful Filipino women in "Tropical Ternos', draped in his iconic patterns and designs. Sold and distributed by Auro in the Philippines, Taiwan, Bahrain, Australia and Japan. Proceeds went to Auro's Agricultural programs in turning Filipino farmers into Agri-entrepreneurs.

His résumé includes work collaborations with Uniqlo , Diesel, Absolute Vodka  Sweden, Zandra Rhodes, Bench Asia, Harrods, House of Fraser, Ghost London, Clements Ribeiro, Cacharel, Allegra Hicks, stylist Jane How, stylist Sarah Richardson and the presentation of design works for designers such as Donna Karan and  Phoebe Philo for Chloé, whilst his works have been exhibited in the Asian Fashion Grand Prix in Osaka in 1998, the Future Map exhibition in The London Institute Mayfair Gallery, Fashion in Motion at the Victoria and Albert Museum London and Artistic Portfolio Congress, Lisbon in 2002,  at the Stadt Museum for The Fashion Generation in Landeshauptstadt Düsseldorf in 2005 and Denim - Fabric of Our Lives , The Hub Museum, Lincolnshire, England, 2008.
 
Appearances of Mobo's works in books and publications include Fifty by Diesel, 1 Brief, 50 Designers, 50 Solutions in Fashion Design Spain, Generation Mode book by Stadt Museum Germany, ArtReview Magazine London, British Journal of Photography, Another Magazine, Exit Magazine, Dazed & Confused magazine, i-d magazine, Self-Service Magazine Paris, Jalouse Paris, Elle Germany, Vogue Italia, Vogue Australia, Vogue Portugal, Vogue Spain, Vogue Japan, Teen Vogue USA, Studio Voice Japan, Crash Paris, Zoo Germany, Neo 2 Spain, Vanity Fair (magazine)|Vanity Fair Italy, Zink New York, Pig Magazine Italy, Muse, Lips Thailand, Crash Magazine Paris, Flux, Maxi Germany, Elle Netherlands, Glamour Italy, La Repubblica, Il Sole 24 Ore, Citizen K, Le Vif Express, Purple magazine, and The Times, The Guardian, The Independent and The Sunday Telegraph  newspapers in the UK.

References

Lesley Mobo designs T-shirtline for Uniqlo Inquire 
 Fabric of Our Lives Exhibition Explored - Lesley Mobo, Vivienne Westwood, Christian Lacroix, Diesel, Hussein Chalayan and Jean Paul Gaultier 
Lesley Mobo, the most successful Filipino fashion designer of the moment 
Victoria & Albert Museum "Fashion in Motion" Central Saint Martins' finale collection by Lesley Mobo - This collection has plundered the riches of several continents over may millennia for its inspiration. Sumptuous fabrics and dramatic silhouettes 
Bio3-zone, Diesel with the Ingeo fiber garments of Lesley Mobo (Diesel Award winner), Docare, Fortei, Fucci, Gaspard Yurkievich, Paul Simon, Salewa, Urban Outfitters, Versace Sport and Wickers have all agreed to create specially-designed clothing to be sold in stores worldwide. 
Lesley Mobo all set to soar at the Mall of Asia Arena 
From edgy lace to drapings - Lesley Mobo shows Manila what he's got - Inquirer Newspaper 
Who's Who in Fashion 6th Edition Bloomsbury Publishing and fairchild Books 
Abolut Label 1879 Lesley Mobo designs for Absolut Vodka Sweden 
Presenting Lesley Mobo, Philippine Star 
Lesley Mobo: Homecoming King, Philippine Star Newspaper

External links
Lesley Mobo Official Website

1982 births
Living people
Filipino fashion designers